Kevin J. Donahue (born October 4, 1994) is an American professional stock car racing driver. He last competed part-time in the NASCAR Gander RV & Outdoors Truck Series, driving the Nos. 33 and 00 Toyota Tundras for Reaume Brothers Racing.

Racing career
In 2016, Donahue made his Camping World Truck Series debut along with his brother Kyle at the Texas Roadhouse 200 at Martinsville, driving the No. 07 truck for MB Motorsports. He started 29th and finished 30th due to engine problems. He also drove at Phoenix in the No. 71 truck for MB Motorsports, starting 26th and finishing 20th.

In 2017, Donahue returned for five races, driving the Nos. 63 and 36 trucks for MB Motorsports. He finished 21st at Kansas, 27th in Fort Worth, 26th at Gateway, 28th at Iowa, and 29th in Chicago.

In 2018, Donahue drove the No. 63 truck for MB Motorsports at Martinsville and Kansas, finishing 30th and 32nd.

After a two-year absence, Donahue returned to the Truck Series in July 2020, running both races of the doubleheader at Kansas Speedway for Reaume Brothers Racing, driving the No. 33 in the Friday race and the No. 00 in the Saturday race.

Motorsports career results

NASCAR
(key) (Bold – Pole position awarded by qualifying time. Italics – Pole position earned by points standings or practice time. * – Most laps led.)

Gander RV & Outdoors Truck Series

 Season still in progress

References

External links
 

1994 births
Living people
NASCAR drivers
People from Chesterfield, Missouri
Racing drivers from Missouri
Racing drivers from St. Louis